Mansel is a surname and a given name. 

Notable people with the surname include:

Baron Mansel, a title that existed in Great Britain between 1712 and 1750, holders included:
Thomas Mansel, 1st Baron Mansel (c.1668–1723)
Bussy Mansel, 4th Baron Mansel (died 1750)
Christopher Rice Mansel Talbot (1803–1890), Welsh landowner and industrialist
Sir Courtenay Mansel (1880–1933), Welsh landowner, farmer, barrister, politician
Conwyn Mansel-Jones (1871–1942), British Army officer, recipient of the Victoria Cross during the Boer War
Sir Edward Mansel (1637–1706), Welsh politician
Dean Henry Longueville Mansel (1820–1871), English philosopher
James Mansel (1907–1995), English Anglican priest, chaplain to the Queen
Sir John Mansel (1190–1265), Secretary of State and Lord Chancellor to Henry III of England
John Mansel (1729–1794), British Army cavalry general
Sir Rice Mansel (1487–1559), British politician
William Lort Mansel (1753–1820), English Anglican priest, Bishop of Bristol
Philip Mansel (born 1951), British author and historian

People with the given name:

 Professor Sir Mansel Aylward
 Mansel Thomas (1909–1986), Welsh composer and conductor

See also
 Mansel baronets
 Mansel Island in Hudson Bay, Canada
 Mansel Lacy, a village and civil parish in Herefordshire, England
 Mansel, a character in the Fire Emblem: The Sacred Stones GBA video game
 Mansell, a surname
 Maunsell, a surname